Under My Skin is the second studio album by Canadian singer-songwriter Avril Lavigne. It was released on May 19, 2004, by Arista Records and RCA Records. Lavigne wrote most of the album with singer-songwriter Chantal Kreviazuk, who invited her to a Malibu in-house recording studio shared by Kreviazuk and her husband Raine Maida, where Lavigne recorded many of the songs. The album was produced by Maida, Don Gilmore, and Butch Walker. It is Lavigne's final album to be released on Arista, as she departed the label after its release.

Under My Skin debuted at number one on the Canadian Albums Chart and on the US Billboard 200. It sold three million copies in the United States, ranking the album number 149 on the Billboard 200 decade-end chart. Because of the album's darker, heavier, more aggressive vibe reminiscent of post-grunge and more melodic rockier songs, it received generally positive reception from critics at the point of considering it as one of the classic albums that defined pop punk music in the early 00's, and also one of the works that anticipated the emotional intensity and theatrical aesthetics of emo pop music in the mainstream. On March 18, 2013, Under My Skin was re-released as a double-disc set paired with her debut studio album, Let Go, which was released under Arista Records. To promote the album, Lavigne went on a promotional tour for malls in the United States and Canada. Furthermore, Lavigne embarked on a concert tour, entitled the Bonez Tour, starting on September 26, 2004, and ending one year later on September 26, 2005. The concert at the Budokan Stadium in Japan was filmed and released on a DVD only available in Japan, entitled Bonez Tour 2005: Live at Budokan. Under My Skin had sold 10 million copies worldwide and is the fifth best selling album of the 21st century by a Canadian artist. 

Critics described Under My Skin as post-grunge, alternative rock, and nu metal containing some gothic rock, grunge, folk rock, and hard rock influences.

Background
Having no plans of working with producers or professional writers, Lavigne wrote much of the album with Canadian singer-songwriter Chantal Kreviazuk, with whom she had developed a friendship in the summer of 2003. Kreviazuk, whose husband Raine Maida's band Our Lady Peace opened for Lavigne's concert in Europe, introduced herself at an after-party for the SARS benefit concerts held in Toronto in June 2003. The following day, Lavigne and Kreviazuk ate lunch together, during which Lavigne shared how she wanted the development of the album to be. They wrote songs for almost three weeks at Maida's warehouse in Toronto. Kreviazuk invited Lavigne to continue working in a Malibu, California house she shared with Maida, which contained a recording studio. Many of the tracks on the album were recorded in Malibu.

Kreviazuk suggested Maida produce songs for the album, an ability Lavigne did not possess. Maida produced five songs, including "Fall to Pieces", which he co-wrote with Lavigne. Lavigne also invited two other producers: Don Gilmore, who produced three songs, two of which were written by Lavigne and Kreviazuk, and Butch Walker who also produced three songs in three days. Lavigne also co-wrote one track, "Nobody's Home", with Ben Moody, formerly of Evanescence, and the rest with her guitarist Evan Taubenfeld.

On her website, Lavigne states that she had learned a lot since her first record, Let Go: "I was involved in every aspect of making this record. I'm very hands-on. I knew how I wanted the drums, the guitar tones, and the structures to be. I understand the whole process so much better this time because I've been through it. I'm really picky with my sound." Regarding the album's theme, Lavigne stated, "I've gone through so much, so that's what I talk about....Like boys, like dating or relationships".

Release and singles
Under My Skin was released on May 12, 2004, in Japan and later on May 25, 2004, in the United States and worldwide. Lavigne released four official singles from the album, and two promotional singles.
 "Don't Tell Me" was the first single from the album, written by Lavigne and Evan Taubenfeld and produced by Butch Walker. It earned Lavigne a nomination at the 2004 MTV VMAs, and charted at number 22 in the Billboard Hot 100, number five in the UK Singles Charts and the top 10 in Australia.
 "My Happy Ending" was the second single; it was written by Lavigne alongside its producer Butch Walker. The song returned Under My Skin to number one in Canada for several weeks, and to the top five in Germany, the UK, Australia, and other European countries. It was Lavigne's fourth number one single on the US Mainstream Top 40 and was her second platinum single since "Complicated" (2002). The song became a worldwide hit.
 "Nobody's Home" was the third single released from the album, written by Lavigne and former Evanescence member Ben Moody and produced by Don Gilmore. The song peaked lower in most countries than some of her previous singles.
 "He Wasn't" was the fourth single from the album, written by Lavigne and Chantal Kreviazuk and produced by Raine Maida. Despite charting in several countries, it was not a significant hit, failing to reach the top 20 in most markets. It was not released in the United States, where "Fall to Pieces" was released instead.
 "Fall to Pieces" was released in North America on April 18, 2005.

Other songs
 "Take Me Away" was also a radio-only single first released in Canada and later in Australia. In Canada, it was a promotional single preceding "Don't Tell Me".

Critical reception

According to Metacritic, Under My Skin received an average rating of 65, reflecting a generally positive reception from critics.. David Browne of Entertainment Weekly suggested that in the album, "Lavigne has become even more, well, complicated", noting she "sounds more burdened". Browne adds, "As contrived as the results can be, there's no denying the level of craft at work." Sal Cinquemani of Slant magazine noted that Lavigne's sound was now much heavier and darker and compared her to Amy Lee of Evanescence, as did Browne. Carly Carioli of Blender magazine also agreed, stating "she has deepened and darkened her sound without sacrificing her platinum-plated melodies". Kelefa Sanneh of Rolling Stone praised Lavigne's vocals, "blankness is what makes her best songs so irresistible. Whether it's a fit of faux punk or a maudlin ballad, she sings it all absolutely straight". Musically the album's sound is compared to "that of crunching punk guitars playing mighty power chords, all mixed with the same flawless elan that has characterized pop-punk ever since Green Day dropped Dookie" says Tim O'Neil of PopMatters. Andrew Strickland of Yahoo! Music agreed, "the girl can use those tiny lungs to great effect...she knows when to croon and when to yell". 

On a more mixed note, Stephen Thomas Erlewine of AllMusic wrote that the album is "a bit awkward, sometimes sounding tentative and unsure, sometimes clicking and surging on Avril's attitude and ambition." Erlewine compared Lavigne to Canadian singer-songwriter Alanis Morissette. Cinquemani cited Lavigne's lyrics as her "biggest weakness" and Strickland agreed, stating, "we have a maturing Ms Lavigne, distancing herself from the teen antics of her "Let Go" debut, but struggling to find any stories worth telling". Tim O'Neil of PopMatters stated "Lavigne's songwriting on the bulk of Under My Skin just seems rote" and goes on to call Under My Skin "a good, if slightly disappointing, follow-up". The Guardians Alexis Petridis lambasted the album, calling it a "flesh-eating virus" and criticised the lyrics, stating "the music is so anodyne that you don't pay much attention to Lavigne's lyrics. This proves to be a small mercy". Under My Skin is included in an article about Petridis' worst reviewed albums of modern times.

Accolades

Commercial performance
Under My Skin debuted at number one on the US Billboard 200, selling 381,000 copies in its first week. This feat marked Lavigne's highest first-week sales of her career and also her first number-one album, It also topped the US Billboard Internet Albums chart, it spent 66 weeks on the US Billboard 200 chart. The album was certified double Platinum by the Recording Industry Association of America (RIAA) in November 2004; by January 2006 it was certified triple Platinum. The album was ranked at number 22 in the year-end chart of the Billboard 200 in 2004 and at number 68 in 2005. , Under My Skin has sold 3.2 million copies in the US.

In Canada, Under My Skin debuted at number one on the Billboard Canadian Albums chart with sales of 63,000 copies, it spent 22 weeks on the chart. It was certified 5× Platinum in Canada with 500,000 copies sold,In the United Kingdom, the album debuted at number one on the UK Albums (OCC) with sales of 87,500 copies, it spent 37 weeks on the chart. It was certified 2× Platinum in the UK with sales of 600,000 copies sold. In Japan the album debuted at number one on the Japanese Albums (Oricon) chart with sales of 286,894 copies, and was certified Million in Japan with sales of 1 million copies sold making it the best selling album in the country by a female Canadian singer, and also number one in Australia, Spain, Mexico, Taiwan and Germany. In New Zealand the album debuted at number seven on the New Zealand Albums (RMNZ) and spent five months on the chart and was certified Gold in the country. On April 15, 2007, the album re-entered the UK Albums Chart at number 60. Worldwide, Under My Skin had sold 10 million copies.

Promotional tours

To promote Under My Skin, Lavigne went on the "Live and by Surprise Tour", a 21-city mall tour in the United States and Canada. The venue in each city wasn't announced until 48 hours before the show, which began on March 5, 2004, in Milwaukee, Wisconsin, the week "Don't Tell Me" was released to radio. Accompanied by her guitarist Evan Taubenfeld, Lavigne performed a short live acoustic version of five songs from the album. The set also included "Sk8er Boi" from Let Go. Selections of this tour were released on the Live Acoustic EP, which was released exclusively in Target stores.

Bonez Tour
To further promote the album, Lavigne embarked on a world concert tour during 2004 and 2005. The Bonez Tour visited North America, Europe, Asia, Africa and Latin America. The 140-show tour began on September 26, 2004, and ended one year later on September 25, 2005. Opening acts for the concerts included Simple Plan and Butch Walker. At some shows, Lavigne covered songs such as "American Idiot" by Green Day and "All the Small Things" by Blink-182. The live performance at the Budokan Stadium was recorded on the DVD Bonez Tour 2005: Live at Budokan, which was only made available in Japan.

Track listing

Personnel
Credits adapted from the liner notes of Under My Skin.

Musicians

Avril Lavigne – lead vocals, background vocals, guitar (12)
Kenny Aronoff – percussion (6, 10), drums (6, 10)
Josh Freese – drums (1, 8)
Victor Lawrence – cello (5, 12)
Butch Walker – acoustic guitar (6), bass (3, 6, 11), percussion (3, 11), piano (6), electric guitar (3, 6, 11), keyboards (3), background vocals (3)
Michael Ward – guitar (1–2, 8)
Patrick Warren – strings (6), keyboards (6), Chamberlin (6)
Phil X – guitar (4–5, 9–10)
Brooks Wackerman – drums (2, 7)
Raine Maida – keyboards (5, 9), guitar (10, 12)
Chantal Kreviazuk – piano (2), keyboards (5)
Mike Elizondo – bass (4)
Brian Garcia – percussion (4–5, 10, 12)
Sam Fisher – violin (5)
Samuel Formicola – violin (12)
Mark Robertson – violin (5, 12)
Kenny Cresswell – drums (3)
Shanti Randall – viola (5)
Jason Lader – bass (5, 9–10, 12)
Bill Lefler – drums (4–5, 9, 12)
Static – keyboards (2)
Jon O'Brien – keyboards (1, 7–8)
Nick Lashley – guitar (10)
Evan Taubenfeld – acoustic guitar (3, 11), drums (11), electric guitar (3, 11), background vocals (3, 11)
Ben Moody – guitar (7)
Alma Fernandez – viola (12)

Production

Avril Lavigne – string arrangements (5)
David Campbell – string arrangements (7)
Don Gilmore – production (1–2, 7–8)
Tom Lord-Alge - mixing (3–7, 9–12)
Randy Staub - mixing (1–2, 8)
Butch Walker – programming (3, 6, 11), producer (3, 6, 11)
Raine Maida – producer (4–5, 9–10, 12), digital editing (5, 9, 12), string arrangements (5, 12)
Chantal Kreviazuk – string arrangements (5, 12)
John Rummen – art direction, design
Leon Zervos – mastering
Brian Garcia – digital editing (4–5, 9–10, 12)
Dan Certa – additional engineering (1–2, 7–8), editing (1–2, 7–8)
Kim Kinakin – art direction, design
Jason Lader – programming (5, 9–10, 12), digital editing (4–5, 9–10, 12)
Dan Chase – Pro Tools engineering (6)
Jon O'Brien – programming (1–2, 7–8)
Static – programming (2)
Christie Priode – production coordinator (6, 11)

Charts

Weekly charts

Year-end charts

Decade-end charts

Certifications

Release history

Notes

References

External links
 

2004 albums
Albums produced by Butch Walker
Albums produced by Raine Maida
Arista Records albums
Avril Lavigne albums
RCA Records albums
Juno Award for Pop Album of the Year albums